Sibianor aurocinctus is a species of jumping spider that can be found the Palearctic realm.

Description
The species are blackish-red, and have four to eight eyes.

Distribution
It occurs in the Palearctic realm, including England, where it was discovered in Hertfordshire on 29 July 2012.

Systematics
This species was known as Bianor aurocinctus until 2001.

References

 (2007): The world spider catalog, version 8.0. American Museum of Natural History.

External links
Picture (as Bianor aurocinctus)

Salticidae
Palearctic spiders
Spiders of Europe
Spiders described in 1865